The Service national de la police ferroviaire (National Railway Police Service), created on 27 June 2006, is a service of the General Directorate of the French National Police of the Central Directorate of Border Police (DCPAF), with national jurisdiction. It is responsible for the safety of passengers and railway operators on the metropolitan rail network. It carries out its missions on board trains and at railway stations, some of which are included in the perimeter of priority safety zones (ZSP).

See also 

 Sous-direction régionale de la police des transports (SDRPT) in Île-de-France, dependant of Paris Police Prefecture
 Groupe de protection et de sécurité des réseaux (GPSR), of the RATP.
 Sûreté ferroviaire (Suge), of the SNCF

References

National Police (France)
2006 establishments in France
Government agencies established in 2006
Specialist law enforcement agencies of France
France